The Ngauranga Gorge is in the Wellington Region of New Zealand. State Highway 1 runs through the gorge, a vital link between central Wellington City and its northern suburbs and Porirua City and the Kapiti Coast; it is the main route north out of Wellington. Sixty-five thousand vehicles a day travel through it, and it connects the Wellington Urban Motorway with the Johnsonville–Porirua Motorway.

The name is derived from the former Ngā Hauranga pā at the foot of the gorge. Its spelling was simplified after the second world war.

Formation

A Ngahauranga Road Association was formed in late 1850 because residents of Johnsonville and places further north found the road up the Ngaio Gorge, now the Old Porirua Road, too steep and dangerous. The road had been built privately for access to a farm with its homestead within Trelissick Crescent, Ngaio. A Fighting Fund was established and a deputation sent to the governor of the province who advised the matter would be referred to the Surveyor General. The residents regarded the matter to be as important to Wellington as the tunnel through the Port Hills was to Christchurch.

Work began in 1853 and by the end of 1855 a distance of 946 metres had been formed and metalled. That was the easy part. The next year saw another 3,340 metres added but that section was only a bridle path.

The Ngahauranga Road built to coach road standard was officially opened 4 June 1858 when his Honour, the Superintendent, led by the band of the 65th drove a four-horse phaeton along the line starting from the beach at Ngahauranga.

Centennial Highway
The road up the gorge was transformed between July 1938 and November 1939 as an extra part of the Wellington to Paekakariki project later dubbed the Centennial Highway. In June 1938 Bob Semple, Minister of Works, announced the administration of Ngahauranga Gorge would leave Wellington City and Suburban Highways Board and join the new system of State Highways. He said "Motoring mishaps, some more serious than others, are not uncommon, due principally to the tortuous nature of this road and the density of traffic which amounts to between 3000 and 4000 vehicles per day. . . . Briefly the intention is to completely re-align and re-grade the road through the Ngahauranga Gorge so as ultimately to provide for four lanes of traffic." On commencement of the project the new Minister "symbolised the new administration's optimism and the power of machinery over the picks and shovels by getting into a bulldozer and wrecking a pile of wheelbarrows". The Ngauranga Gorge four-lane highway was officially opened on 4 November 1939.

Motorway

The first section of the Johnsonville–Porirua Motorway opened in December 1950 but traffic was funnelled through Johnsonville until a bypass was completed towards the end of the 1950s joining the Gorge's four lanes to the Motorway. A junction controlled by lights remained between the two highways until the end of the 20th century. During the 1960s the road through the gorge was widened from four to six-lanes. This required considerable excavation and the rock removed went into harbour reclamation for the construction of the Wellington Urban Motorway completed in 1969. 

The Ngauranga Interchange flyover joining State Highways 1 and 2 was finished in 1984.

The Newlands Interchange, at the top of the gorge, was constructed in 1997–98 to replace the simple junction controlled by traffic lights, which caused a large amount of congestion. Further excavation and widening of the gorge was required to construct the interchange and a short uphill section between Abattoirs Road the Newlands exit was widened to four uphill lanes.

The North Island Main Trunk railway crosses the bottom of the gorge via an overbridge between the Tawa No 1 and Tawa No 2 Tunnels of the Tawa Flat deviation.

There is an industrial area and some retail outlets at the bottom of the gorge, where there was previously an abattoir. Another abattoir and a quarry are part way up the gorge.

Maintenance
On 11 July 2017 the southbound (down) lanes were closed by a rock slip about mid-day (until 6 am the next day) due to a "debris avalanche" on a modified slope above the lanes.

Notes

References

External links
Ngauranga Gorge 2015
Photo of Fall in Lower Gorge (Fig 2) from 1911 paper
Photos of road construction in 1938/9
 
 
 

Wellington City
Canyons and gorges of New Zealand
Rock formations of the Wellington Region
State Highway 1 (New Zealand)